The Mixed Doubles Łódź is an annual mixed doubles curling tournament on the ISS Mixed Doubles World Curling Tour. It is held annually in the Fall at Curling Łódź in Łódź, Poland.

The purse for the event is €2,500, with the winning pair receiving €900. Its event categorization is 100 (highest calibre is 1000).

The event has been held since 2018.

Past champions

References

External links
Official Website

World Curling Tour events
Curling in Poland
Sports competitions in Łódź
Lodz